A general election was held in the U.S. state of Illinois on November 4, 2014. All of Illinois' executive officers were up for election as well as a United States Senate seat, and all of Illinois' eighteen seats in the United States House of Representatives. Primary elections were held on March 18, 2014.

Election information
2014 was a midterm election year in the United States.

Turnout

Primary election
For the primary election, turnout was 18.09%, with 1,357,807 votes cast.

Turnout by county

General election
For the general election, turnout was 49.18%, with 3,680,417 votes cast.

Turnout by county

Federal elections

United States Senate

Incumbent Democratic senator and Senate Majority Whip Dick Durbin won reelection to a fourth term.

United States House

All of Illinois' 18 seats in the United States House of Representatives were up for election in 2014.

The Republican Party flipped two Democratic-held seat, making the composition of Illinois' House delegation 10 Democrats and 8 Republicans.

Governor and Lieutenant Governor

Incumbent Democratic Governor Pat Quinn ran for re-election to a second full term as governor. Quinn, the then-lieutenant governor, assumed the office of governor on January 29, 2009, when Rod Blagojevich was impeached and removed from office. He was narrowly elected to a first full term in 2010.

Quinn was renominated by the Democrats, while the Republicans chose businessman and venture capitalist Bruce Rauner and the Libertarians nominated political activist Chad Grimm.

Previously in Illinois, there were separate primary elections for governor and lieutenant governor, with the winners then running together on the same ticket. In 2011, the law was changed and candidates for governor now pick their own running mate. Incumbent Democratic lieutenant governor Sheila Simon did not run for re-election, instead running unsuccessfully for Comptroller. She was replaced as Quinn's running mate by former Chicago Public Schools CEO Paul Vallas. Rauner chose Wheaton City Councilwoman Evelyn Sanguinetti and Grimm chose Alex Cummings.

Rauner defeated Quinn in the general election by 50.3% of the vote to Quinn's 46.4%. Rauner won every county in Illinois except for Cook County, home to the city of Chicago and 40% of the state's residents.

Attorney General

Incumbent Democratic Attorney General Lisa Madigan ran for re-election to a fourth term in office.

Democratic primary

Candidates

Declared
 Lisa Madigan, Illinois Attorney General

Results

Republican primary

Candidates

Declared
 Paul Schimpf, attorney and former U.S. Marine Corps infantry officer

Withdrew
 Mark Curran, Lake County sheriff
 Mike Webster, attorney, accountant, and president Cass School District 63 Board of Education (ran for Secretary of State)

Declined
 Tom Cross, state representative and former minority leader of the Illinois House of Representatives (ran for Treasurer)
 Jim Durkin, state representative (replaced Cross as Minority Leader)

Results

General election

Polling

Results

Secretary of State

Incumbent Democratic Secretary of State Jesse White ran for re-election to a fifth term in office.

Democratic primary

Candidates

Declared
 Jesse White, Illinois Secretary of State

Results

Republican primary

Candidates

Declared
 Mike Webster, attorney, accountant, and president of the Cass School District 63 Board of Education

Withdrew
 Will Lindsey, businessman

Results

General election

Polling

Results

Comptroller

Incumbent Republican Comptroller Judy Baar Topinka ran for re-election to a second term in office. , this was the last time a Republican was elected Comptroller.

Democratic primary

Candidates

Declared
 Sheila Simon, Lieutenant Governor of Illinois

Results

Republican primary

Candidates

Declared
 Judy Baar Topinka, Illinois Comptroller

Withdrew
 William J. Kelly, political activist, columnist, and candidate for Illinois Comptroller in 2010

Results

General election

Polling

Results

Aftermath
Topinka died on December 10, 2014. Governor Pat Quinn appointed Jerry Stermer to serve out the remainder of her term. A special election was held for the office in 2016.

Treasurer

Incumbent Republican Treasurer Dan Rutherford did not run for re-election to a second term in office. He instead ran unsuccessfully for the Republican nomination for governor.

Republican primary

Candidates

Declared
Tom Cross, minority leader of the Illinois House of Representatives
Bob Grogan, DuPage County auditor

Withdrew
 Michael Scott Carter, financial executive
 Bob Schillerstrom, former chairman of the DuPage County Board and candidate for governor in 2010

Declined
 Darin LaHood, state senator
 Dan Rutherford, Illinois Treasurer

Polling

Results

Democratic primary

Candidates

Declared
 Mike Frerichs, state senator and former Champaign County auditor

Results

General election

Polling

Results

State Senate

One-third of the seats of the Illinois Senate were up for election in 2014.

State House of Representatives

All of Illinois' 18 seats in the United States House of Representatives were up for election in 2014.

The Republican Party flipped two Democratic-held seats, making the composition of Illinois' House delegation 10 Democrats and 8 Republicans.

Judicial elections

Judicial elections were held, which consisted of both partisan and retention elections, including those one seat of the Supreme Court of Illinois for ten seats in the Illinois Appellate Court.

Ballot measures
Illinois voters voted on a two ballot measures in 2014. In order to be approved, the measures required either 60% support among those specifically voting on the amendment or 50% support among all ballots cast in the elections.

Illinois Crime Victims' Bill of Rights

Illinois voters approved the Illinois Crime Victims' Bill of Rights (commonly known as "Marsy's Law"), a legislatively referred constitutional amendment.

Results

Illinois Right to Vote Amendment

Illinois voters approved the Illinois Right to Vote Amendment, a legislatively referred constitutional amendment. The amendment was designed to provide that no person shall be denied the right to register to vote or cast a ballot in an election based on race, color, ethnicity, language, national origin, religion, sex, sexual orientation or income.

Both proponents and opponents argued that the legislation was intended to block Voter Identification laws from being passed in Illinois.

The measure added a Section 8 to Article III of the Constitution of Illinois which reads,

Results

Local elections
Local elections were held. These included county elections, such as the Cook County elections.

Notes

References

External links

 
Illinois